The 2016 Rugby Europe Women's Sevens Trophy was the second level of international women's rugby sevens competitions organised by Rugby Europe during 2016. The competition featured two tournaments, one hosted in Prague and one hosted in Esztergom. Sweden won both tournaments. Sweden and Poland were promoted to the 2017 Grand Prix series while Norway and Denmark were relegated to the 2017 Conferences.

Tournament 1 (Prague)

Pool stage

Pool A

Pool B

Pool C

Knockout stage

Bowl

Plate

Cup

Tournament 2 (Esztergom)

Pool stage

Pool A

Pool B

Pool C

Knockout stage

Bowl

Plate

Cup

Final standings

References

A
2016
Europe
Europe
2016 in Czech women's sport
2016 in Hungarian sport